John Edward Jennings (1906–1973) was an American historical novelist. He wrote many best-selling novels of American history and seagoing adventure. He also wrote several nonfiction books on history.

Jennings was born in Brooklyn, New York and studied engineering and literature at Columbia University. He had his first experience of seafaring at age 19 as a hand aboard a tramp steamer in the Black Sea and eastern Mediterranean. In World War II he served as a lieutenant commander in the US Navy and was the head of the US Naval Aviation History Unit.

He first wrote short stories and travel narratives. His first novel, Next to Valour was published in 1939 and became a best-seller, translated into seven languages. It concerned life along the Merrimack River during the French and Indian War. His most popular novel was The Salem Frigate, a romantic adventure set on the US frigate Essex. Other seafaring adventures included The Sea Eagles, about the early days of the US Navy, and Chronicle of the Calypso, Clipper about a clipper race. Banners Against the Wind (1954) was a biographical novel about the pioneering doctor Samuel Gridley Howe.

Selected bibliography

Novels
Next to Valour (1939)
Call the New World (1941)
Gentleman Ranker (1942)
The Shadow and the Glory (1943) 
The Salem Frigate (1946)
River to the West: A Novel of the Astor Adventure (1948)
The Sea Eagles (1950)
The Pepper Tree (1950)
Banners Against the Wind (1954)
Shadows in the Dark (1955)
Chronicle of the Calypso, Clipper (1955)
The Wind in His Fists (1956)
The Raider (1963) - World War I naval warfare

Nonfiction
Our American Tropics (1938)
Boston, Cradle of Liberty, 1630-1776 (1947)
Clipper Ship Days: The Golden Age of American Sailing Ships (1952)
The Golden Eagle (1959)
Tattered Ensign (1966) - the launching of the USS Constitution, and the early US Navy

References

Sources
The Encyclopedia of American Literature of the Sea and Great Lakes (2000), Greenwood Publishing Group, p. 213
Twentieth Century Authors: A Biographical Dictionary of Modern Literature (1942), by Stanley Kunitz and Howard Haycraft, H.W. Wilson Company

1906 births
1973 deaths
Columbia University alumni
United States Navy personnel of World War II
American historical novelists
20th-century American novelists
American male novelists
20th-century American male writers